Bampada Mukherjee was an Indian politician. He was elected as MLA of Hirapur Vidhan Sabha Constituency in 1969, 1971, 1977 and 1982. He was the first Mayor of Asansol Municipal Corporation. He died on 13 April 2019 at the age of 97.

References

2019 deaths
Communist Party of India (Marxist) politicians
West Bengal MLAs 1969–1971
West Bengal MLAs 1971–1972
West Bengal MLAs 1977–1982
West Bengal MLAs 1982–1987
Mayors of places in West Bengal
1920s births
Year of birth missing